The Ministry of Physical Infrastructure and Transport is a governmental body of Nepal that oversees infrastructure developments including transportation systems, most prominently linking rural areas, in Nepal. The ministry is located in Singha Durbar, Kathmandu.

Organisational structure
While the Ministry of Culture, Tourism and Civil Aviation oversees air transportation, the Ministry of Physical Infrastructure and Transport deals with domestic transport including road and rail transportation as well as waterways.
The Ministry has several departments and subdivisions:
 Department of Road
 Department of Transport Manangement
 Department of Railways
 Road Board Nepal

Former Ministers of Physical Infrastructure and Transport
This is a list of former Ministers of Physical Infrastructure and Transport since the Nepalese Constituent Assembly election in 2013:

References

Physical Infrastructure and Transport
Nepal
Transport organisations based in Nepal
2000 establishments in Nepal